Proctoporus unsaacae is a species of lizard in the family Gymnophthalmidae. The species is endemic to Peru.

Etymology
The specific name, unsaacae, is in honor of the herpetological research group at the Universidad Nacional de San Antonio Abad de Cusco (UNSAAC).

Geographic range
P. unsaacae is found in the Department of Cuzco, Peru.

Habitat

Reproduction
P. unsaacae is oviparous.

References

Further reading
Doan TM, Castoe TA (2003). "Using Morphological and Molecular Evidence to Infer Species Boundaries within Proctoporus bolivianus Werner (Squamata: Gymnophthalmidae)". Herpetologica 59 (3): 432–449. (Proctoporus unsaacae, new species).

Proctoporus
Reptiles of Peru
Endemic fauna of Peru
Reptiles described in 2003
Taxa named by Tiffany M. Doan
Taxa named by Todd Adam Castoe
Lizards of South America
Lizards